Someydeh may refer to:
 Someydeh, Hoveyzeh
 Someydeh, Shushtar